The National Residence Hall Honorary, or NRHH, is the premiere honorary dedicated to recognizing leaders in the residence halls ("dorms") and is as a branch of NACURH, Inc. NACURH, as an organization, believes that recognition is necessary in a strong Residence Hall community. The National Residence Hall Honorary was founded in 1964 to recognize student leaders at universities.

The honorary, although a national organization, has multiple levels of leadership. The most important level is established on university campuses through the creation of chapters. NRHH chapters recognize top leaders that reside on campus through induction into their respective institution's chapter. The NRHH chapter membership allows for on and off campus members who have and continue to make positive contributions to the residence halls.

History
In 1964, the National Association of College and University Residence Halls became financially unstable. The NACURH Chair at the time found for additional streams of revenue through grants. In order to obtain these grants, NACURH needed to create a central office, and more services needed to be provided to member schools. Because of this, the National Residence Hall Honorary was created.

In the 1980s NRHH expanded by beginning to provide pins and certificates. Additionally a formal set of recruitment and affiliation packets were created. The Of The Month (OTM) award was established around the same time. In the early 2000s, the NRHH National Office designed a catalog of merchandise, such as clothing apparel, other pins, window clings, and graduation honor cords just to name a few, to offer to the chapters to purchase.

NRHH was supervised at the national level by the NRHH National Office until it was replaced by the NACURH Services and Recognition Office (NSRO) in 2006. Most of the NSRO functions were the same as the former office, except that NRHH chapters affiliated with the NACURH Information Center (NIC) along with their respective school's residence hall association (RHA). Today, the NSRO and NIC have been replaced by the NACURH Corporate Office (NCO), which has absorbed responsibilities of the former offices and primarily serves as the corporate hub for affiliation and merchandise. 

Around 200 chapters are currently affiliated with the organization.

Leadership
At the close of the NACURH 2008 conference, NRHH became more connected with the NACURH corporate structure through the creation of the NACURH Associate for NRHH position, which was added as a full member of the NACURH Executive Committee, as well as the NACURH Board of Directors. This position serves as the Executive Director of the honorary and oversees all off the regional associate directors for NRHH who serve as executive officers of the honorary for their regional constituencies. Together, the NACURH Associate and Regional Associate Directors for NRHH form the NRHH Board of Directors, which serves as the international governing body of the honorary.

The leadership of NRHH is as follows as of the 2022-2023 affiliation year:

Membership Advantages
By affiliating with National Association of College and University Residence Halls and NRHH, member schools can participate in Of The Month award nominations. They can also purchase recognition pins, membership pins, induction certificates, and membership cords for graduating members through the NACURH Corporate Office (NCO) Store, which only affiliated chapters that completed the affiliation process for that academic year can access. Affiliated schools can also access a variety of resources through the NCO including affiliation documents, program descriptions, and other materials that the NCO develops and provides to its members.

In order to maintain affiliation status, institutions must pay a fee to NACURH every year. For the 2018-2019 year, the Full Affiliation price was $130.00. There is also a "Partial membership" option, for $80.00, which only allows for services offered at the national level. 

Some universities lapse in affiliation, either due to lack of payment, leadership issues with their RHA and/or NRHH, or coming to the decision that the resources of NACURH are not worth the cost. When a school lapses in affiliation, they lose voting rights in business and may not receive contact or resources from regional board members.

External links

References

University organizations
Honor societies

Organizations established in 1964